The 61st Army was a field army of the Red Army and the Soviet Ground Forces. It was created in 1941 and disbanded in 1945. It took part in Operation Bagration and the Riga Offensive of 1944.

Structure during the Battle of Kursk 
During the Battle of Kursk the army was part of the Bryansk Front.

 9th Guards Rifle Corps
 12th Guards Rifle Division
 76th Guards Rifle Division
 77th Guards Rifle Division
 97th Rifle Division
 110th Rifle Division
 336th Rifle Division
 356th Rifle Division
 415th Rifle Division
 12th Anti-Tank Artillery Brigade
 68th Tank Brigade
 36th Tank Regiment
 1539th Self-Propelled Artillery Regiment
 31st Railroad Armoured Regiment
 45th Railroad Armoured Regiment
 310th Engineer Battalion
 344th Engineer Battalion
 60th Guards Artillery Regiment
 67th Guards Artillery Regiment
 554th Artillery Regiment
 547th Mortar Artillery Regiment
 533rd Anti-Tank Artillery Regiment
 1282nd Anti-Aircraft Artillery Regiment
 13th Anti-Aircraft Artillery Division
 1065th Anti-Aircraft Artillery Regiment
 1173rd Anti-Aircraft Artillery Regiment
 1175th Anti-Aircraft Artillery Regiment
 1218th Anti-Aircraft Artillery Regiment

Commanders
The following officers commanded the army:

Colonel General Fyodor Kuznetsov (10 November–18 December 1941)
Lieutenant General Markian Popov (18 December 1941–28 June 1942)
Lieutenant General Pavel Belov (promoted to Colonel General 26 July 1944; 28 June 1942–after May 1945)

References

Citations

Bibliography

External links
 Просмотрено цензурой
 Клуб память. 61-я армия
 Боевые действия Красной армии в ВОВ. 61-я армия
 Смерш. Документы войны

Military units and formations established in 1941
Military units and formations disestablished in 1945